The 2018–19 Richmond Spiders women's basketball team represents the University of Richmond during the 2018–19 NCAA Division I women's basketball season. The Spiders, led by fourteenth year head coach Michael Shafer, play their home games at the Robins Center and were members of the Atlantic 10 Conference. They finished the season 9–21, 6–10 in A-10 play to finish in eleventh place. They lost in the first round of the A-10 women's tournament to Saint Louis.

It was announced that on March 10 that Shafer would not return, ending his 14-year coaching tenure at Richmond. Shafer leaves as the all-time winningest coach of the program with 223 wins, but never led the Spiders to the NCAA tournament during his time.

2018–19 media
All Spiders games are broadcast on WTVR 6.3 with Robert Fish on the call. The games are also streamed on Spider TV .

Roster

Schedule

|-
!colspan=9 style=| Non-conference regular season

|-
!colspan=9 style=| Atlantic 10 regular season

|-
!colspan=9 style=| Atlantic 10 Tournament

Rankings
2018–19 NCAA Division I women's basketball rankings

See also
 2018–19 Richmond Spiders men's basketball team

References

Richmond Spiders women's basketball seasons
Richmond
Richmond Spiders women's basketball
Richmond